Thoralf is a given name. Notable people with the name include:

Thoralf Arndt (born 1966), former professional German footballer
Thoralf Glad (1878–1969), Norwegian sailor who competed in the 1912 Summer Olympics
Thoralf Hagen (1887–1979), Norwegian rower who competed in the 1920 Summer Olympics
Thoralf Klouman (1890–1940), Norwegian satirical illustrator and actor
Thoralf Knobloch (born 1962), contemporary German painter based in Dresden
Reidar Thoralf Larsen or Reidar T. Larsen (1923–2012), Norwegian politician
Thoralf Peters (born 1968), German rower
Thoralf Pryser (1885–1970), Norwegian journalist and newspaper editor
Thoralf Rafto or Thorolf Rafto (1922–1986), human rights activist and professor in Economic History
Thoralf Sandaker (born 1923), Norwegian former rower who competed in the 1948 Summer Olympics
Thoralf Skolem (1887–1963), Norwegian mathematician who worked in mathematical logic and set theory
Thoralf Strømstad (1897–1984), Norwegian Nordic skier who was awarded the Holmenkollen medal in 1923

See also
Thorolf
Tora (given name)
Toralf